The 2015–16 season was Ulster's 22nd season since the advent of professionalism in rugby union, and the second under Director of Rugby Les Kiss and head coach Neil Doak. They competed in the European Rugby Champions Cup and the Pro12.

In the Pro12, Ulster finished fourth, qualifying for the playoffs and for next season's Champions Cup. They lost to Leinster in the semi-final. Ulster won the Fair Play Award, and wing Craig Gilroy made the Pro12 Dream Team. In the Champions Cup, they finished second in Pool 1, missing out on the knockout stage. Academy wing Jacob Stockdale made his senior debut this season. Centre Stuart McCloskey was Ulster's Player of the Year. Out-half Paddy Jackson was Ulster's leading scorer with 200 points. Craig Gilroy was leading try scorer with ten. Lock Franco van der Merwe was leading tackler with 261. At the end of the season, number eight Nick Williams left for Cardiff Blues, and lock Dan Tuohy for Bristol Bears. Out-half Ian Humphreys retired.

Staff

Squad

Senior squad

Players In
 Willie Faloon from  Connacht
 Sam Windsor from  Worcester Warriors
 Paul Rowley from  London Welsh
 Peter Browne from  London Welsh

Players Out
 Charlie Butterworth to  Jersey
 Ross Adair to  Jersey
 Declan Fitzpatrick retired
 Michael Allen to  Edinburgh Rugby
 Ricky Andrew to  Nottingham
 Michael Heaney to  Doncaster Knights
 Dave Ryan to  Agen
 Neil McComb to  Belfast Harlequins
 Mike McComish released

Academy squad

European Rugby Champions Cup

Pool 1

Pro12

Semi-finals

End of season awards
Wing Craig Gilroy was joint top try scorer with 10, and was named in the Pro12 Dream Team. Ulster won the competition's Fair Play award.

Ulster Ravens

British and Irish Cup

Pool 2

Home attendance

Ulster Rugby Awards
The Heineken Ulster Rugby Awards ceremony was held at the Culloden Estate and Spa, Holywood. Winners were:

Bank of Ireland Ulster Player of the Year: Stuart McCloskey
Heineken Ulster Rugby Personality of the Year: Nick Williams
BT Young Player of the Year: Kyle McCall
Rugby Writers Player of the Year: Franco van der Merwe
Ulster Rugby Supporters Club Player of the Year: Paddy Jackson
Abbey Insurance Academy Player of the Year: Adam McBurney

Season reviews
Ulster: Season Review 2015 – 2016, The Front Row Union, 23 May 2016

References

2015-16
2015–16 in Irish rugby union
2015–16 Pro12 by team
2015–16 European Rugby Champions Cup by team